Back and Forth or Back & Forth may refer to:

Isomorphism
 Back-and-forth method, a method of showing isomorphism between countably infinite structures satisfying specified conditions

Film and TV
 Blackadder: Back & Forth, the last installment in the Blackadder series
 Back and Forth (film), a 1969 film directed by Michael Snow
 Foo Fighters: Back and Forth, a 2011 documentary of the band Foo Fighters

Music

Albums
 Back and Fourth (Pete Yorn album), 2009
 Back and Fourth (Lindisfarne album), 1978
 Back & Forth (EP), self-published debut EP of Skinny Puppy 1984

Songs
 "Back & Forth" (Aaliyah song), 1994 
 "Back and Forth" (B.o.B song), 2015 
 "Back and Forth" (Cameo song), 1987
 "Back & Forth" (MK, Jonas Blue and Becky Hill song), 2018 
 "Back and Forth" (Operator Please song), 2010
"Back and Forth", by Chad Allan (musician) and The Reflections, 1962
"Back and Forth", by Fat Boys, 1988
"Back and Forth", by Freddie Green, 1956
"Back and Forth", by Audiovent from Dirty Sexy Knights in Paris, 2002
"Back and Forth", by State Champs from Around the World and Back, 2015

Other
 Back and Forth (software)

See also
Back and Fourth (Lindisfarne album), 1978
Back and Fourth (Pete Yorn album), 2009